Malkin is a Pakistani drama television series written by Sarwat Nazir and directed by Wajahat Hussain. It stars Maria Wasti, Aly Khan and Samina Ahmed in lead roles. The drama debuted on 25 September 2017 on Geo Entertainment, and last aired on 18 February 2018. The drama encapsulates theme of selfishness, greediness and insensitivity towards other individuals. The idea that a woman is capable of destroying a perfect happy family owing to her own personal interest and selfish desires.

Cast
Maria Wasti as Gulnaz
Samina Ahmed as Nafisa
Alyy Khan as Yawer
Natasha Ali as Bisma
Taifoor Khan as Khizer
Azra Mansoor as Nagina
Adnan Shah Tipu as Munne Mamu
Umer Naru as Saif
Minal Khan as Seemi
Arisha Razi as Neha
Mubassira Aapa as Surayya
Azekah Daniel as Samia
Faraz Farooqui as Shahid
Aliya Malik as Najma Maid
Fouzia Sheikh as Perveen
Anees Alam as Munshi
Ali Ramzan as Ajmal
Ibaad Hussain as Tanveer
Shahrukh as Hassan
Maryam Khalid as Semi Child
Shifa Akbar as Neha Child
M.Moosa as Saif Child
Iman Sheikh as Samia Child
Ahsan Khan as Shahid Child

References

Geo TV original programming
2017 Pakistani television series debuts
Pakistani drama television series
Urdu-language television shows